The Kaohsiung Hakka Cultural Museum is a cultural museum in Sanmin District, Kaohsiung, Taiwan.

History
In 1995, Kaohsiung Mayor Wu Den-yih proposed the construction of the museum to preserve the Hakka culture. The construction of museum building was completed in November 1998.

Architecture
It is located in Sanmin Park and set in 2,645 m2 of land it is dedicated to the Hakka culture, displaying artifacts. The building itself is modelled on traditional Taiwanese Hakka architecture with red glass, tiled roofs and a courtyard.

Opening time
The museum opens everyday except Monday from 9.00 a.m. to 5.00 p.m.

Transportation
The museum is accessible within walking distance West from Houyi Station of the Kaohsiung MRT.

See also
 List of museums in Taiwan

References

1998 establishments in Taiwan
Hakka museums in Taiwan
Museums established in 1998
Museums in Kaohsiung